Governor Bond Lake is a reservoir in Bond County, Illinois, United States. The reservoir was built from 1968 to 1970 as a water supply reservoir for the cities of Greenville, Mulberry Grove, Donnellson, and Smithboro.

References

External links

Protected areas of Bond County, Illinois
Reservoirs in Illinois
Bodies of water of Bond County, Illinois
1968 establishments in Illinois